Aaron Thomas Grant, Jr. (July 3, 1908 – September 22, 1966) was an American football center who played one season with the Portsmouth Spartans of the National Football League. He first played college football for the Tennessee Wesleyan Bulldogs of Tennessee Wesleyan College before transferring to play for the Chattanooga Mocs of the University of Chattanooga. He attended Maryville High School in Maryville, Tennessee.  Grant was inducted into the Tennessee Wesleyan Athletic Hall of Fame in 1993.

References

External links
Just Sports Stats

1908 births
1966 deaths
American football centers
Tennessee Wesleyan Bulldogs football players
Chattanooga Mocs football players
Portsmouth Spartans players
Players of American football from Tennessee
People from Roane County, Tennessee
Place of death missing